Franz Schubert's compositions of 1813 are mostly in the Deutsch catalogue (D) range D 37A–91, and include:
 Instrumental works:
 Symphony No. 1, D 82
 String Quartet No. 4, D 46
 String Quartet No. 5, D 68
 String Quartet No. 6, D 74
 String Quartet No. 10, D 87
 Vocal music:
 Des Teufels Lustschloß, D 84 (composition started late October 1813)
 "Trinklied", D 75
 "Sehnsucht", D 52
 "Der Taucher", D 77

Table

Legend

List

|-
| data-sort-value="967" | 967
| data-sort-value="037.1" | 37A
| data-sort-value="ZZZZ" |
| data-sort-value="ZZZZ" |
| data-sort-value="724,00" | VII/2, 4 Anh.VIII, 2 No. 13
| data-sort-value="Fugue, D 037A" | Fugue sketches, D 37A
| data-sort-value="ZZZZ" |
| data-sort-value="1813-01-01" | 1813?
| For piano
|-
| data-sort-value="038" | 38
| data-sort-value="038" | 38
| data-sort-value="XXX,1892" | (1892)
| data-sort-value="1900,020" | XIXNo. 20
| data-sort-value="304,01" | III, 4 No. 1
| data-sort-value="Totengraberlied, D 38" | Totengräberlied, D 38
| data-sort-value="text Grabe, Spaden, grabe! 1" | Grabe, Spaden, grabe!
| data-sort-value="1813-01-01" | 1813?
| data-sort-value="Text by Holty, Ludwig Heinrich Christoph, Grabe, Spaden, grabe! 1" | Text by Hölty; For ttb
|-
| data-sort-value="039" | 39
| data-sort-value="039" | 39
| data-sort-value="XXX,1969" | (1969)
| data-sort-value="ZZZZ" |
| data-sort-value="406,A2" | IV, 6Anh No. 2
| data-sort-value="Lebenstraum" | Lebenstraum
| data-sort-value="text Ich sass an einer Tempelhalle" | Ich saß an einer Tempelhalle
| data-sort-value="1810-01-01" | early 1810?
| data-sort-value="Text by Baumberg, Gabriele von, Ich sass an einer Tempelhalle" | Text by Baumberg; Sketch; Music related to 
|-
| data-sort-value="999.00391" |
| data-sort-value="039.1" | 39A
| data-sort-value="ZZZZ" |
| data-sort-value="ZZZZ" |
| data-sort-value="609,00" | VI, 9
| data-sort-value="Minuets, 03, D 039A" | Three Minuets with Trios, D 39A
| data-sort-value="ZZZZ" |
| data-sort-value="1813-01-01" | 1813
| For orchestra; Lost
|-
| data-sort-value="041" | 41
| data-sort-value="041" | 41
| data-sort-value="XXX,1889" | (1889)
| data-sort-value="1200,030" | XIINo. 30
| data-sort-value="726,00" | VII/2, 6
| data-sort-value="Minuets, 30, D 041" | Thirty Minuets with Trios, D 41
| data-sort-value="key I" | Various keys
| data-sort-value="1813-01-01" | 1813
| For piano; Nos. 1–8, 11–18 and 20–23 are extant
|-
| data-sort-value="999.00411" |
| data-sort-value="041.1" | 41A
| data-sort-value="ZZZZ" |
| data-sort-value="ZZZZ" |
| data-sort-value="724,00" | VII/2, 4 Anh.
| data-sort-value="Fugue, D 041A" | Fugue, D 41A
| data-sort-value="key E minor" | E minor
| data-sort-value="1813-01-01" | 1813
| For piano; Fragment
|-
| data-sort-value="042" | 42
| data-sort-value="042" | 42
| data-sort-value="XXX,1895" | (1895)(1969)
| data-sort-value="2010,570" | XX, 10No. 570
| data-sort-value="406,05" | IV, 6 No. 5 Anh. No. 3
| data-sort-value="Aria di Timante" | Aria di Timante
| data-sort-value="text Misero pargoletto" | Misero pargoletto
| data-sort-value="1813-01-01" | 1813?
| Text by Metastasio, from Demofoonte III, 5; For s and piano; Two settings: 1st, not in AGA, consisting of two variant fragments
|-
| data-sort-value="043" | 43
| data-sort-value="043" | 43
| data-sort-value="XXX,1897" | (1897)
| data-sort-value="2104,043" | XXI, 4No. 43
| data-sort-value="304,02" | III, 4 No. 2VIII, 2 No. 34
| data-sort-value="Spruche des Confucius, D 43" | Sprüche des Confucius, D 43
| data-sort-value="text Dreifach ist der Schritt der Zeit 1" | Dreifach ist der Schritt der Zeit
| data-sort-value="1813-07-08" | 8/7/1813
| data-sort-value="Text by Schiller, Friedrich, Dreifach ist der Schritt der Zeit 1" | Text by Schiller (other settings:  and 70); For ttb
|-
| data-sort-value="044" | 44
| data-sort-value="044" | 44
| data-sort-value="XXX,1894" | (1894)
| data-sort-value="2001,007" | XX, 1No. 7
| data-sort-value="406,06" | IV, 6No. 6
|  data-sort-value="Totengraberlied, D 44" | Totengräberlied, D 44
| data-sort-value="text Grabe, Spaden, grabe! 2" | Grabe, Spaden, grabe!
| data-sort-value="1813-01-19" | 19/1/1813
| data-sort-value="Text by Holty, Ludwig Heinrich Christoph, Grabe, Spaden, grabe! 2" | Text by Hölty
|-
| data-sort-value="045" | 45
| data-sort-value="045" | 45
| data-sort-value="XXX,1888" | (1888)
| data-sort-value="1400,021" | XIV No. 21
| data-sort-value="105,02" | I, 5
| data-sort-value="Kyrie, D 045" | Kyrie, D 45
| data-sort-value="key B-flat major" | B majorKyrie
| data-sort-value="1813-03-01" | 1/3/1813
| data-sort-value="Text: Mass ordinary 03" | Text: Mass ordinary (other settings: , 31, 49, 56, 66, 105, 167, 324, 452, 678, 755 and 950); For SATB
|-
| data-sort-value="046" | 46
| data-sort-value="046" | 46
| data-sort-value="XXX,1890" | (1890)
| data-sort-value="0500,004" | V No. 4
| data-sort-value="603,05" | VI, 3 No. 6
| data-sort-value="String Quartet, D 046" | String Quartet No. 4
| data-sort-value="key C major" | C major
| data-sort-value="1813-03-07" | 3/3/1813–7/3/1813
| Adagio – Andante con moto – Minuet – Finale
|-
| data-sort-value="047" | 47
| data-sort-value="047" | 47
| data-sort-value="XXX,1974" | (1974)
| data-sort-value="ZZZZ" |
| data-sort-value="302,91" | III, 2bAnh. No. 1
| data-sort-value="Dithyrambe, D 047" | Dithyrambe, D 47
| data-sort-value="text Nimmer, das glaubt mir, erscheinen die Gotter 1" | Nimmer, das glaubt mir, erscheinen die Götter
| data-sort-value="1813-03-29" | 29/3/1813
| data-sort-value="Text by Schiller, Friedrich, Nimmer, das glaubt mir, erscheinen die Gotter 1" | Text by Schiller; For tbSATB and piano; Fragment
|-
| data-sort-value="048" | 48
| data-sort-value="048" | 48
| data-sort-value="XXX,1871" | (1871)(1888)
| data-sort-value="0903,032" | IX, 3No. 32
| data-sort-value="711,03" | VII/1, 1No. 3
| data-sort-value="Fantasy, D 048" | Fantasy, D 48, a.k.a. Grand Sonata
| data-sort-value="key C minor" | C minor
| data-sort-value="1813-06-10" | April 1813–10/6/1813
| For piano duet; AGA includes concluding fugue
|-
| data-sort-value="049" | 49
| data-sort-value="049" | 49
| data-sort-value="XXX,1888" | (1888)
| data-sort-value="1400,015" | XIV No. 15
| data-sort-value="105,03" | I, 5
| data-sort-value="Kyrie, D 049" | Kyrie, D 49
| data-sort-value="key D minor" | D minorKyrie
| data-sort-value="1813-04-15" | early April1813–15/4/1813
| data-sort-value="Text: Mass ordinary 04" | Text: Mass ordinary (other settings: , 31, 45, 56, 66, 105, 167, 324, 452, 678, 755 and 950); For satbSATB and orchestra; First part of a Mass
|-
| data-sort-value="050" | 50
| data-sort-value="050" | 50
| data-sort-value="XXX,1894" | (1894)
| data-sort-value="2001,008" | XX, 1No. 8
| data-sort-value="406,07" | IV, 6No. 7
| data-sort-value="Schatten, Die " | Die Schatten
| data-sort-value="text Freunde, deren Grufte sich schon bemoosten!" | Freunde, deren Grüfte sich schon bemoosten!
| data-sort-value="1813-04-12" | 12/4/1813
| data-sort-value="Text by Matthisson, Friedrich von, Freunde, deren Grufte sich schon bemoosten!" | Text by Matthisson
|-
| data-sort-value="051" | 51
| data-sort-value="051" | 51
| data-sort-value="XXX,1897" | (1897)
| data-sort-value="2104,037" | XXI, 4No. 37
| data-sort-value="304,03" | III, 4 No. 3
| data-sort-value="Unendliche Freude, D 51" | Unendliche Freude, D 51
| data-sort-value="text Unendliche Freude durchwallet das Herz 1" | Unendliche Freude durchwallet das Herz
| data-sort-value="1813-04-15" | 15/4/1813
| data-sort-value="Text by Schiller, Friedrich from Elysium 03 1" | Text by Schiller, stanza 3 from "Elysium" (other stanzas and settings: , 54, 57, 58, 60 and 584); For ttb
|-
| data-sort-value="052" | 52
| data-sort-value="052" | 52
| data-sort-value="XXX,1868" | (1868)
| data-sort-value="2001,009" | XX, 1No. 9
| data-sort-value="402,b08" | IV, 2b No. 8
| data-sort-value="Sehnsucht, D 052" | Sehnsucht, D 52
| data-sort-value="text Ach, aus dieses Tales Grunden 1" | Ach, aus dieses Tales Gründen
| data-sort-value="1813-04-17" | 15/4/1813–17/4/1813
| data-sort-value="Text by Schiller, Friedrich, Ach, aus dieses Tales Grunden 1" | Text by Schiller; For b and piano
|-
| data-sort-value="053" | 53
| data-sort-value="053" | 53
| data-sort-value="XXX,1892" | (1892)
| data-sort-value="1900,009" | XIXNo. 9
| data-sort-value="304,04" | III, 4 No. 4
| data-sort-value="Voruber die stohnende Klage" | Vorüber die stöhnende Klage
| data-sort-value="text Voruber die stohnende Klage! 1" | Vorüber die stöhnende Klage!
| data-sort-value="1813-04-18" | 18/4/1813
| data-sort-value="Text by Schiller, Friedrich from Elysium 01" | Text by Schiller, stanza 1 from "Elysium" (other stanzas and settings: , 54, 57, 58, 60 and 584); For ttb
|-
| data-sort-value="054" | 54
| data-sort-value="054" | 54
| data-sort-value="XXX,1873" | (1873)
| data-sort-value="1900,022" | XIXNo. 22
| data-sort-value="304,05" | III, 4 No. 5VIII, 2 No. 17
| data-sort-value="Unendliche Freude, D 54" | Unendliche Freude, D 54
| data-sort-value="text Unendliche Freude durchwallet das Herz 2" | Unendliche Freude durchwallet das Herz
| data-sort-value="1813-04-19" | 19/4/1813
| data-sort-value="Text by Schiller, Friedrich from Elysium 03 2" | Text by Schiller, stanza 3 from "Elysium" (other stanzas and settings: , 53, 57, 58, 60 and 584); Canon for three male voices
|-
| data-sort-value="055" | 55
| data-sort-value="055" | 55
| data-sort-value="XXX,1892" | (1892)
| data-sort-value="1900,012" | XIXNo. 12
| data-sort-value="304,06" | III, 4 No. 6
| data-sort-value="Selig durch die Liebe" | Selig durch die Liebe
| data-sort-value="text Selig durch die Liebe Gotter" | Selig durch die Liebe Götter
| data-sort-value="1813-04-21" | 21/4/1813
| data-sort-value="Text by Schiller, Friedrich from Triumph der Liebe, Der 01 1" | Text by Schiller, from "Der Triumph der Liebe": stanza 1; Other: , 62, 63, 64, 983A; For ttb
|-
| data-sort-value="056" | 56
| data-sort-value="056" | 56
| data-sort-value="XXX,1892" | (1892)
| data-sort-value="1900,029" | XIXNo. 29
| data-sort-value="105,04" | I, 5VIII, 2 No. 18
| data-sort-value="Sanctus, D 056" | Sanctus, D 56
| data-sort-value="key B-flat major" | B majorSanctus
| data-sort-value="1813-04-21" | 21/4/1813
| data-sort-value="Text: Mass ordinary 05" | Text: Mass ordinary (other settings: , 31, 45, 49, 66, 105, 167, 324, 452, 678, 755 and 950); Canon for three voices; Two versions
|-
| data-sort-value="057" | 57
| data-sort-value="057" | 57
| data-sort-value="XXX,1897" | (1897)
| data-sort-value="2104,038" | XXI, 4No. 38
| data-sort-value="304,07" | III, 4 No. 7
| data-sort-value="Hier strecket der wallende Pilger" | Hier strecket der wallende Pilger
| data-sort-value="text Hier strecket der wallende Pilger" | Hier strecket der wallende Pilger
| data-sort-value="1813-04-29" | 29/4/1813
| data-sort-value="Text by Schiller, Friedrich from Elysium 04" | Text by Schiller, stanza 4 from "Elysium" (other stanzas and settings: , 53, 54, 58, 60 and 584); For ttb
|-
| data-sort-value="058" | 58
| data-sort-value="058" | 58
| data-sort-value="XXX,1892" | (1892)
| data-sort-value="1900,010" | XIXNo. 10
| data-sort-value="304,08" | III, 4 No. 8
| data-sort-value="Dessen Fahne Donnersturme wallte" | Dessen Fahne Donnerstürme wallte
| data-sort-value="text Dessen Fahne Donnerstürme wallte" | Dessen Fahne Donnerstürme wallte
| data-sort-value="1813-05-01" | May 1813
| data-sort-value="Text by Schiller, Friedrich from Elysium 05" | Text by Schiller, stanza 5 from "Elysium" (other stanzas and settings: , 53, 54, 57, 60 and 584); For ttb
|-
| data-sort-value="059" | 59
| data-sort-value="059" | 59
| data-sort-value="XXX,1832" | (1832)
| data-sort-value="2001,010" | XX, 1No. 10
| data-sort-value="406,08" | IV, 6No. 8
| data-sort-value="Verklarung" | Verklärung
| data-sort-value="text Lebensfunke, vom Himmel entgluht" | Lebensfunke, vom Himmel entglüht
| data-sort-value="1813-05-04" | 4/5/1813
| data-sort-value="Text by Herder, Johann Gottfried after Pope's The dying Christian to his soul" | Text by Herder after Pope's "The dying Christian to his soul"
|-
| data-sort-value="060" | 60
| data-sort-value="060" | 60
| data-sort-value="XXX,1892" | (1892)
| data-sort-value="1900,011" | XIXNo. 11
| data-sort-value="304,16" | III, 4 No. 16
| data-sort-value="Hier umarmen sich getreue Gatten" | Hier umarmen sich getreue Gatten
| data-sort-value="text Hier umarmen sich getreue Gatten" | Hier umarmen sich getreue Gatten
| data-sort-value="1813-10-03" | 3/10/1813
| data-sort-value="Text by Schiller, Friedrich from Elysium 06" | Text by Schiller, stanza 6 from "Elysium" (other stanzas and settings: , 53, 54, 57, 58 and 584); For ttb
|-
| data-sort-value="061" | 61
| data-sort-value="061" | 61
| data-sort-value="XXX,1897" | (1897)
| data-sort-value="2104,039" | XXI, 4No. 39
| data-sort-value="304,09" | III, 4 No. 9VIII, 2 No. 19
| data-sort-value="Ein jugendlicher Maienschwung" | Ein jugendlicher Maienschwung
| data-sort-value="text Ein jugendlicher Maienschwung" | Ein jugendlicher Maienschwung
| data-sort-value="1813-05-08" | 8/5/1813
| data-sort-value="Text by Schiller, Friedrich from Triumph der Liebe, Der 09 2" | Text by Schiller, from "Der Triumph der Liebe": stanza 9; Other: , 62, 63, 64, 983A; Canon for three voices
|-
| data-sort-value="062" | 62
| data-sort-value="062" | 62
| data-sort-value="XXX,1897" | (1897)
| data-sort-value="2104,040" | XXI, 4No. 40
| data-sort-value="304,10" | III, 4 No. 10VIII, 2 No. 35
| data-sort-value="Thronend auf erhabnem Sitz" | Thronend auf erhabnem Sitz
| data-sort-value="text Thronend auf erhabnem Sitz" | Thronend auf erhabnem Sitz
| data-sort-value="1813-05-09" | 9/5/1813
| data-sort-value="Text by Schiller, Friedrich from Triumph der Liebe, Der 15 3" | Text by Schiller, from "Der Triumph der Liebe": stanza 15; Other: , 61, 63, 64, 983A
|-
| data-sort-value="063" | 63
| data-sort-value="063" | 63
| data-sort-value="XXX,1892" | (1892)
| data-sort-value="1900,013" | XIXNo. 13
| data-sort-value="304,11" | III, 4 No. 11
| data-sort-value="Wer die steile Sternenbahn" | Wer die steile Sternenbahn
| data-sort-value="text Wer die steile Sternenbahn" | Wer die steile Sternenbahn
| data-sort-value="1813-05-10" | 10/5/1813
| data-sort-value="Text by Schiller, Friedrich from Triumph der Liebe, Der 26 4" | Text by Schiller, from "Der Triumph der Liebe": stanza 26; Other: , 61, 62, 64, 983A; For ttb
|-
| data-sort-value="064" | 64
| data-sort-value="064" | 64
| data-sort-value="XXX,1897" | (1897)
| data-sort-value="2104,041" | XXI, 4No. 41
| data-sort-value="304,12" | III, 4 No. 12VIII, 2 No. 36
| data-sort-value="Majestat'sche Sonnenrosse" | Majestät'sche Sonnenroße
| data-sort-value="text Majestat'sche Sonnenrosse" | Majestät'sche Sonnenroße
| data-sort-value="1813-05-10" | 10/5/1813
| data-sort-value="Text by Schiller, Friedrich from Triumph der Liebe, Der 16 5" | Text by Schiller, from "Der Triumph der Liebe": stanza 16; Other: , 61, 62, 63, 983A; For ttb
|-
| data-sort-value="065" | 65
| data-sort-value="065" | 65
| data-sort-value="XXX,1892" | (1892)
| data-sort-value="1900,035" | XIXAnh. I, No. 35
| data-sort-value="304,B1" | III, 4Anh. II No. 1VIII, 2 No. 20
| data-sort-value="Schmerz verzerret ihr Gesicht" | Schmerz verzerret ihr Gesicht
| data-sort-value="text Schmerz verzerret ihr Gesicht" | Schmerz verzerret ihr Gesicht
| data-sort-value="1813-05-11" | 11/5/1813
| data-sort-value="Text by Schiller, Friedrich from Gruppe aus dem Tartarus 02 1" | Text by Schiller, from "Gruppe aus dem Tartarus": stanza 2 (other settings:  and 583); For ttb; Sketch
|-
| data-sort-value="066" | 66
| data-sort-value="066" | 66
| data-sort-value="XXX,1888" | (1888)
| data-sort-value="1400,016" | XIV No. 16
| data-sort-value="105,05" | I, 5
| data-sort-value="Kyrie, D 066" | Kyrie, D 66
| data-sort-value="key F major" | F majorKyrie
| data-sort-value="1813-05-12" | 12/5/1813
| data-sort-value="Text: Mass ordinary 06" | Text: Mass ordinary (other settings: , 31, 45, 49, 56, 105, 167, 324, 452, 678, 755 and 950); For SATB and orchestra
|-
| data-sort-value="067" | 67
| data-sort-value="067" | 67
| data-sort-value="XXX,1897" | (1897)
| data-sort-value="2104,042" | XXI, 4No. 42
| data-sort-value="304,13" | III, 4 No. 13
| data-sort-value="Frisch atmet des Morgens lebendiger Hauch, D 067" | Frisch atmet des Morgens lebendiger Hauch
| data-sort-value="text Frisch atmet des Morgens lebendiger Hauch 1" | Frisch atmet des Morgens lebendiger Hauch
| data-sort-value="1813-05-15" | 15/5/1813
| data-sort-value="Text by Schiller, Friedrich, Frisch atmet des Morgens lebendiger Hauch 1" | Text by Schiller; For ttb
|-
| data-sort-value="068" | 68
| data-sort-value="068" | 68
| data-sort-value="XXX,1890" | (1890)
| data-sort-value="0500,005" | V No. 5
| data-sort-value="603,07" | VI, 3 No. 7
| data-sort-value="String Quartet, D 068" | String Quartet No. 5
| data-sort-value="key B-flat major" | B major
| data-sort-value="1813-08-18" | 8/6/1813–18/8/1813
| Allegro maestoso – Allegro; Middle movements missing
|-
| data-sort-value="069" | 69
| data-sort-value="069" | 69
| data-sort-value="XXX,1892" | (1892)
| data-sort-value="1900,023" | XIXNo. 23
| data-sort-value="304,14" | III, 4 No. 14VIII, 2 No. 21
| data-sort-value="Spruche des Confucius, D 69" | Sprüche des Confucius, D 69
| data-sort-value="text Dreifach ist der Schritt der Zeit 2" | Dreifach ist der Schritt der Zeit
| data-sort-value="1813-07-08" | 8/7/1813
| data-sort-value="Text by Schiller, Friedrich, Dreifach ist der Schritt der Zeit 2" | Text by Schiller (other settings:  and 70); Canon for three voices
|-
| data-sort-value="070" | 70
| data-sort-value="070" | 70
| data-sort-value="XXX,1974" | (1974)
| data-sort-value="ZZZZ" |
| data-sort-value="304,A1" | III, 4Anh. I No. 1VIII, 2 No. 33
| data-sort-value="Spruche des Confucius, D 70" | Sprüche des Confucius, D 70
| data-sort-value="text Dreifach ist der Schritt der Zeit" | Dreifach ist der Schritt der Zeit
| data-sort-value="1813-07-08" | 8/7/1813
| data-sort-value="Text by Schiller, Friedrich, Dreifach ist der Schritt der Zeit 3" | Text by Schiller (other settings:  and 69); For ttb; Fragment
|-
| data-sort-value="071" | 71
| data-sort-value="071" | 71
| data-sort-value="XXX,1892" | (1892)
| data-sort-value="1900,014" | XIXNo. 14
| data-sort-value="304,15" | III, 4No. 15
| data-sort-value="Zwei Tugendwege, Die," | Die zwei Tugendwege
| data-sort-value="text Zwei sind der Wege" | Zwei sind der Wege
| data-sort-value="1813-07-15" | 15/7/1813
| data-sort-value="Text by Schiller, Friedrich, Zwei sind der Wege" | Text by Schiller; For ttb
|-
| data-sort-value="999.00711" |
| data-sort-value="071.1" | 71A
| data-sort-value="XXX,1956" | (1956)
| data-sort-value="ZZZZ" |
| data-sort-value="108,00" | I, 8VIII, 2 No. 22
| data-sort-value="Alleluja, D 071A" | Alleluja, D 71A
| data-sort-value="key F major" | F major
| data-sort-value="1813-07-01" | July 1813?
| Canon for three voices
|-
| data-sort-value="999.00712" |
| data-sort-value="071.2" | 71B
| data-sort-value="ZZZZ" |
| data-sort-value="ZZZZ" |
| data-sort-value="724,00A" | VII/2, 4 Anh.VIII, 2 No. 14
| data-sort-value="Fugue, D 071B" | Fugue, D 71B
| data-sort-value="key E minor" | E minor
| data-sort-value="1813-07-01" | July 1813
| For piano; Fragment
|-
| data-sort-value="966.1" | 966A
| data-sort-value="071.3" | 71C
| data-sort-value="ZZZZ" |
| data-sort-value="ZZZZ" |
| data-sort-value="506,05" | V, 6 No. 5
| data-sort-value="Orchestral piece, D 071C" | Orchestral piece, D 71C
| data-sort-value="key D major" | D major
| data-sort-value="1813-08-01" | Aug. orSep. 1813
| Fragment; First pages, a.k.a. , based on 
|-
| data-sort-value="072" | 72
| data-sort-value="072" | 72
| data-sort-value="XXX,1889" | (1889)(1890)
| data-sort-value="0300,002" | III No. 2XXII v1
| data-sort-value="601,01" | VI, 1 No. 1
| Wind Octet
| data-sort-value="key F major" | F major
| data-sort-value="1813-08-18" | completed18/8/1813
| Allegro (fragment, publ. in 1890) – Minuet – Allegro; Slow middle movement lost?
|-
| data-sort-value="073" | 73
| data-sort-value="073" | 73
| data-sort-value="XXX,1868" | (1868)
| data-sort-value="2001,011" | XX, 1No. 11
| data-sort-value="404,00" | IV, 4
| data-sort-value="Thekla: Eine Geisterstimme, D 073" | Thekla: Eine Geisterstimme, D 73
| data-sort-value="text Wo ich sei, und wo mich hingewendet 1" | Wo ich sei, und wo mich hingewendet
| data-sort-value="1813-08-23" | 22/8/1813–23/8/1813
| data-sort-value="Text by Schiller, Friedrich, Wo ich sei, und wo mich hingewendet 1" | Text by Schiller
|-
| data-sort-value="074" | 74
| data-sort-value="074" | 74
| data-sort-value="XXX,1890" | (1890)
| data-sort-value="0500,006" | V No. 6
| data-sort-value="604,08" | VI, 4 No. 8
| data-sort-value="String Quartet, D 074" | String Quartet No. 6
| data-sort-value="key D major" | D major
| data-sort-value="1813-09-01" | 22/8/1813–Sep. 1813
| Allegro ma non troppo – Andante – Minuet – Allegro
|-
| data-sort-value="966.2" | 966A
| data-sort-value="074.1" | 74A
| data-sort-value="ZZZZ" |
| data-sort-value="ZZZZ" |
| data-sort-value="506,04" | V, 6 No. 4
| data-sort-value="Orchestral piece, D 074A" | Orchestral piece, D 74A
| data-sort-value="key D major" | D major
| data-sort-value="1813-08-01" | Aug. orSep. 1813
| Fragment; Variant D number for first pages of 
|-
| data-sort-value="075" | 75
| data-sort-value="075" | 75
| data-sort-value="XXX,1850" | (1850)
| data-sort-value="1600,016" | XVINo. 16
| data-sort-value="303,18" | III, 3 No. 18
| data-sort-value="Trinklied, D 075" | Trinklied, D 75
| data-sort-value="text Freunde, sammelt euch im Kreise" | Freunde, sammelt euch im Kreise
| data-sort-value="1813-08-29" | 29/08/1813
|-
| data-sort-value="076" | 76
| data-sort-value="076" | 76
| data-sort-value="XXX,1871" | (1871)(1969)
| data-sort-value="2010,571" | XX, 10No. 571
| data-sort-value="406,09" | IV, 6 No. 9 Anh. No. 4
| data-sort-value="Aria di Fronimo" | Aria di Fronimo
| data-sort-value="text Pensa, che questo istante" | Pensa, che questo istante
| data-sort-value="1813-09-13" | 7 and 13Sep. 1813
| Text by Metastasio, from Alcide al bivio, 1; For b and piano; Two versions (2nd in AGA)
|-
| data-sort-value="077" | 77111
| data-sort-value="077" | 77
| data-sort-value="XXX,1831" | (1831)(1894)
| data-sort-value="2001,012" | XX, 1No. 12
| data-sort-value="406,10" | IV, 6No. 10
| data-sort-value="Taucher, Der" | Der Taucher
| data-sort-value="text Wer wagt es, Rittersmann oder Knapp" | Wer wagt es, Rittersmann oder Knapp
| data-sort-value="1815-01-01" | 17/9/1813–early 1815
| data-sort-value="Text by Schiller, Friedrich, Wer wagt es, Rittersmann oder Knapp" | Text by Schiller; Two versions: 2nd, publ. in 1894, was 
|-
| data-sort-value="078" | 78
| data-sort-value="078" | 78
| data-sort-value="XXX,1895" | (1895)
| data-sort-value="2010,572" | XX, 10No. 572
| data-sort-value="406,11" | IV, 6 No. 11
| Aria di Venere
| data-sort-value="text Son fra l'onde" | Son fra l'onde
| data-sort-value="1813-09-18" | 18/9/1813
| Text by Metastasio, from Gli orti esperdi, I; For s and piano
|-
| data-sort-value="079" | 79
| data-sort-value="079" | 79
| data-sort-value="XXX,1889" | (1889)
| data-sort-value="0300,003" | III No. 3
| data-sort-value="601,02" | VI, 1 No. 2
| data-sort-value="Wind Nonet" | Wind Nonet, a.k.a. Eine kleine Trauermusik or Franz Schuberts Begräbniß-Feyer
| data-sort-value="key E-flat minor" | E minor
| data-sort-value="1813-09-19" | 19/9/1813
| Grave con espressione
|-
| data-sort-value="080" | 80
| data-sort-value="080" | 80
| data-sort-value="XXX,1892" | (1892)
| data-sort-value="1900,004" | XIXNo. 4
| data-sort-value="303,02" | III, 3 No. 2Anh. III No. 1Anh. IV No. 1
| Zur Namensfeier meines Vaters
| data-sort-value="text Ertone Leier zur Festesfeier!" | Ertöne Leier zur Festesfeier!
| data-sort-value="1813-09-27" | 27/9/1813
| data-sort-value="Text by Schubert, Franz, Ertone Leier zur Festesfeier!" | Text by Schubert; For ttb and guitar
|-
| data-sort-value="081" | 81
| data-sort-value="081" | 81
| data-sort-value="XXX,1895" | (1895)
| data-sort-value="2010,583" | XX, 10No. 583
| data-sort-value="414,00" | IV, 14
| Auf den Sieg der Deutschen
| data-sort-value="text Verschwunden sind die Schmerzen 1" | Verschwunden sind die Schmerzen
| data-sort-value="1813-09-21" | fall 1813
| data-sort-value="Text by Schubert, Franz?, Verschwunden sind die Schmerzen 1" | Text by Schubert?; For voice, two violins and cello
|-
| data-sort-value="082" | 82
| data-sort-value="082" | 82
| data-sort-value="XXX,1884" | (1884)
| data-sort-value="0101,001" | I, 1No. 1
| data-sort-value="501,01" | V, 1 No. 1
| data-sort-value="Symphony No. 01" | Symphony No. 1
| data-sort-value="key D major" | D major
| data-sort-value="1813-10-28" | completed28/10/1813
| Adagio, Allegro vivace – Andante – Minuet – Allegro vivace
|-
| data-sort-value="083" | 83
| data-sort-value="083" | 83
| data-sort-value="XXX,1895" | (1895)
| data-sort-value="2010,582" | XX, 10No. 582
| data-sort-value="414,00" | IV, 14
| Zur Namensfeier des Herrn Andreas Siller
| data-sort-value="text Des Phobus Strahlen" | Des Phöbus Strahlen
| data-sort-value="1813-11-04" | 28/10/1813–4/11/1813
| For voice, violin and harp
|-
| data-sort-value="084" | 84
| data-sort-value="084" | 84
| data-sort-value="XXX,1888" | (1888)
| data-sort-value="1501,001" | XV, 1No. 1
| data-sort-value="201,00" | II, 1
| data-sort-value="Teufels Lustschloss, Des" | Des Teufels Lustschloß
| data-sort-value="theatre (Singspiel in 3 acts)" | (Singspiel in three acts)
| data-sort-value="1814-10-22" | 30/10/1813–22/10/1814
| data-sort-value="Text by Kotzebue, August von Teufels Lustschloss, Des" | Text by Kotzebue; Music for sssttbbbSSSATTBB and orchestra; Two versions: Overture (2nd version in AGA) – Act I (Nos. 1–11, 2nd version in AGA) – Act II (Nos. 12–17, 1st version only, in AGA) – Act III (Nos. 18–23, 1st version Nos. 21 and 23 only, 2nd version in AGA); Sketch of an orchestral piece (from 1st version of Act III?): compare 
|-
| data-sort-value="086" | 86
| data-sort-value="086" | 86
| data-sort-value="XXX,1886" | (1886)
| data-sort-value="0200,010" | IINo. 10
| data-sort-value="604,A1" | VI, 4Anh. No. 1VI, 9
| data-sort-value="Minuet, D 086" | Minuet, D 86
| data-sort-value="key D major" | D major
| data-sort-value="1813-11-01" | November1813?
| For string quartet
|-
| data-sort-value="087" | 87
| data-sort-value="087" | 87
| data-sort-value="125,1840-1" | 125p,1(1840)
| data-sort-value="0500,010" | VNo. 10
| data-sort-value="604,09" | VI, 4 No. 9
| data-sort-value="String Quartet, D 087" | String Quartet No. 10
| data-sort-value="key E-flat major" | E major
| data-sort-value="1813-11-01" | November1813
| data-sort-value="Allegro piu moderato – Scherzo – Adagio – Allegro" | Allegro più moderato – Scherzo – Adagio – Allegro
|-
| data-sort-value="999.00871" |
| data-sort-value="087.1" | 87A
| data-sort-value="ZZZZ" |
| data-sort-value="ZZZZ" |
| data-sort-value="604,A2" | VI, 4 Anh. No. 2
| data-sort-value="Andante, D 087A" | Andante, D 87A
| data-sort-value="key C major" | C major
| data-sort-value="1813-11-01" | November1813
| For four voices (string quartet or vocal ensemble?); Fragment
|-
| data-sort-value="088" | 88
| data-sort-value="088" | 88
| data-sort-value="XXX,1892" | (1892)
| data-sort-value="1900,021" | XIXNo. 21
| data-sort-value="304,17" | III, 4 No. 17VIII, 2 No. 23
| Verschwunden sind die Schmerzen
| data-sort-value="text Verschwunden sind die Schmerzen 2" | Verschwunden sind die Schmerzen
| data-sort-value="1813-11-15" | 15/11/1813
| data-sort-value="Text by Schubert, Franz?, Verschwunden sind die Schmerzen 2" | Text by Schubert?; Canon for ttb
|-
| data-sort-value="089" | 8990
| data-sort-value="089" | 89
| data-sort-value="XXX,1886" | (1886)
| data-sort-value="0200,008" | II No. 8 and No. 9
| data-sort-value="609,00" | VI, 9
| data-sort-value="Minuets, 05, D 089" | Five Minuets and Five German Dances
| data-sort-value="key I" | Various keys
| data-sort-value="1813-11-19" | 19/11/1813
| For string quartet; Minuets have six Trios, German Dances have seven Trios and a Coda
|-
| data-sort-value="091" | 91
| data-sort-value="091" | 91
| data-sort-value="XXX,1956" | (1956)
| data-sort-value="ZZZZ" |
| data-sort-value="726,00" | VII/2, 6
| data-sort-value="Minuets, 02, D 091" | Two Minuets, D 91
| data-sort-value="key I" | Various keys
| data-sort-value="1813-11-22" | 22/11/1813
| For piano; Each minuet with two Trios
|}

Lists of compositions by Franz Schubert
Compositions by Franz Schubert
Schubert